The legal code was a common feature of the legal systems of the ancient Middle East. Many of them are examples of cuneiform law. The Sumerian Code of Ur-Nammu (c. 2100–2050 BCE), then the Babylonian Code of Hammurabi (c. 1760 BCE), are amongst the earliest originating in the Fertile Crescent. In the Roman empire, a number of codifications were developed, such as the Twelve Tables of Roman law (first compiled in 450 BCE) and the Corpus Juris Civilis of Justinian, also known as the Justinian Code (429–534 CE). In ancient China, the first comprehensive criminal code was the Tang Code, created in 624 CE in the Tang Dynasty. In India, the Edicts of Ashoka (269–236 BCE) were followed by the Law of Manu (200 BCE).

The following is a list of ancient legal codes in chronological order:

 Cuneiform law
 Code of Urukagina (2380–2360 BCE)
 Code of Ur-Nammu, king of Ur (c. 2050 BCE). Copies with slight variations found in Nippur, Sippar and Ur
 Laws of Eshnunna (c. 1930 BCE)
 Codex of Lipit-Ishtar of Isin (c. 1870 BCE)
 Babylonian law
 Code of Hammurabi (c. 1750 BCE in middle chronology)
 Hittite laws, also known as the 'Code of the Nesilim' (developed c. 1650–1500 BCE, in effect until c. 1100 BCE)
 Law of Moses / Torah (10th–6th century BCE)
 Halakha (Jewish religious law, including biblical law and later talmudic and rabbinic law, as well as customs and traditions) 
 Assyrian law, also known as the Middle Assyrian Laws (MAL) or the Code of the Assyrians/Assura (developed c. 1450–1250 BCE, oldest extant copy c. 1075 BCE)  
 Draconian constitution (late 7th century BCE)
 Solonian Constitution (early 6th century BCE)
 Gortyn code (5th century BCE)
 Twelve Tables of Roman Law (451 BCE)
 Edicts of Ashoka of Buddhist Law (269–236 BCE)
 Law of Manu (c. 200 BCE)
 Tirukkural, Ancient Tamil laws and ethics compiled by Thiruvalluvar (31 BCE–500 CE)
 Corpus Juris Civilis (compiled 529–534 CE)
 Code of Justinian 
 Digest or Pandects
 Institutes of Justinian
 Novellae Constitutiones
 Sharia or Islamic Law (c. 570; Hanafi fiqh was not codified until the Ottoman Mecelle of the 1870s, the other schools were even later)
 Traditional Chinese law
 Tang Code (624 to 637)
 Visigothic Code (642–653 CE
 Gentoo Code (origins unknown; translated from Sankskrit into Persian, English, German and French in 1776–1778)
 Early Irish law or Brehon Law (8th century CE)

See also

 Legal culture

References

Legal codes
Legal codes
Law in ancient history
Law-related lists